Marc Judith (born January 19, 1987) is a French professional basketball player for Orléans Loiret Basket of LNB Pro B.

In 2011–12, Judith averaged 7.3 points, 3.4 rebounds and 2.2 assists per game for JSF Nanterre. After the season he extended his contract. In the 2014–15 season he posted 2.6 points and 2.1 rebounds per game with Nanterre. Judith signed with JDA Dijon in July 2015. Judith averaged 4 points and 1.8 rebounds per game in 2016–17. In June 2017 he signed a two-year deal with Orléans Loiret Basket.

References 

1987 births
Living people
French men's basketball players
Guadeloupean men's basketball players
JDA Dijon Basket players
Nanterre 92 players
Orléans Loiret Basket players
People from Saint-Claude, Guadeloupe
Small forwards